Gualtherus Johannes Cornelis Kolff (8 November 1826, Gouda – 29 April 1881, Leiden) was the co-founder of G. Kolff & Co., a publishing company in Batavia, Dutch East Indies of the Bataviaasch Nieuwsblad newspaper.  The company also operated book shops. In the years after Indonesia became independent, the company moved to the Netherlands, and is now based mostly in Amsterdam and Leeuwarden.

References

External links
Biography at Biography Portal of the Netherlands

1826 births
1881 deaths
19th-century Dutch journalists
Dutch publishers (people)
People from Batavia, Dutch East Indies
People from Gouda, South Holland